The 1995 Winnipeg municipal election was held on October 25, 1995 to elect a mayor, councillors and school trustees in the city of Winnipeg.

Susan Thompson defeated Peter Kaufmann and Terry Duguid in the mayoral contest.

Results

Mayor

Councillors

Ed Mullis worked as a tax specialist in Montreal before leaving to work in Winnipeg's Union Gospel Mission in 1987.  He later founded Forward House Ministries, and became the chaplain at Winnipeg International Airport.  He ran for city council in 1995 at age 50, arguing that schools would need to teach morality to counter the threat of youth street crime.  He supported curfews, and floated the possibility of "boot camps".  Mullis indicated that he was not a member of any political party.  He is a Christian and a Biblical literalist, and has spoken of his personal opposition to homosexuality and the ordination of women.
Stefan Sigurdson was a fifty-year-old painting and decorating contractor.  He called for provincial lottery profits to be used to reduce property taxes and finance infrastructure.  He also called for the contracting out of municipal services.
Michael Keating was a 34-year-old employee in Revenue Canada's tax department.  He called for a crackdown on welfare cheats. and for the contracting out of municipal services.

Former councillor George Provost initially sought election for this ward, but withdrew from the campaign before election day.

Tyrone Alzubaidi was 32 years old at the time of the election, and was a service station operator.  He said he was running because many residents disapproved of Rick Boychuk's job performance.

School trustees

Transcona-Springfield School Division

Electors could vote for three candidates.  Percentages are determined in relation to the total number of votes.

References

Municipal elections in Winnipeg
1995 elections in Canada
1995 in Manitoba
October 1995 events in Canada